Karl Emanuel Robert Fricke (24 September 1861 – 18 July 1930) was a German mathematician, known for his work in complex analysis, especially on elliptic, modular and automorphic functions. He was one of the main collaborators of Felix Klein, with whom he produced two classic, two-volume monographs on elliptic modular functions and automorphic functions.

In 1893 in Chicago, his paper Die Theorie der automorphen Functionen und die Arithmetik was read (but not by Fricke) at the International Mathematical Congress held in connection with the World's Columbian Exposition. From 1894 to 1930  Fricke was professor of Higher Mathematics at the Technische Hochschule Carolo-Wilhelmina in Braunschweig.

See also

Fricke involution

Bibliography

; 
;

References

External links

1861 births
1930 deaths
People from Helmstedt
19th-century German mathematicians
20th-century German mathematicians
Mathematical analysts
Group theorists
People from the Duchy of Brunswick
Academic staff of the Technical University of Braunschweig